Ich bin ein Star – Holt mich hier raus! returned for its sixth series on 13 January 2012 on RTL. Sonja Zietlow and Dirk Bach returned for their sixth season as hosts. Also the paramedic Bob McCarron alias "Dr. Bob" was back.

On 28 January 2012, the season was won by Brigitte Nielsen, with Kim Gloss finishing as the runner-up.

Celebrities

Results and elimination
 Indicates that the celebrity received the most votes from the public
 Indicates that the celebrity received the fewest votes and was eliminated immediately (no bottom two)
 Indicates that the celebrity was in the bottom two of the public vote

References

External links
 

6
2012 German television seasons